Transcription factor 7 is the gene that in humans encodes for the TCF1 protein.

References

Further reading